Maykop–Ulyap–Maykop was a road bicycle race held in 2015 in Russia, as part of the 2015 UCI Europe Tour. The race was won by Russia's Ivan Balykin.

Winners

References

UCI Europe Tour races
Cycle races in Russia
Recurring sporting events established in 2015
2015 establishments in Russia
Recurring sporting events disestablished in 2015
2015 disestablishments in Russia
Defunct cycling races in Russia